Bulette may refer to 

 Frikadellen, flat, pan-fried meatballs
 Julia Bulette,  19th century prostitute
 Bulette (Dungeons & Dragons), a class of monsters in Dungeons & Dragons

See also 
 Boulette (disambiguation)